Michael Senych (September 24, 1926 - March 27, 2002) was a politician from Alberta, Canada. He served in the Legislative Assembly of Alberta from 1963 to 1971 as a member of the Social Credit Party.

Early life
Michael Senych was born in Corbin, British Columbia. He attended the University of Alberta and worked twenty-six years as a teacher before entering provincial politics.

Political career
Senych was elected to the Alberta legislature in the district of Redwater in the 1963 general election.  He ran for and won a second term in 1967 He ran for a third term in office in the new electoral district of Redwater-Andrew in the 1971 general election; he was defeated  by George Topolnisky of the Progressive Conservative Party.

Senych attempted a return to the legislature in the 1982 general election; he ran as an independent in Redwater-Andrew and was defeated by Topolnisky again, finishing in fourth place out of five candidates. He ran once more under the Representative Party banner in the 1986 Alberta general election; he finished a distant third to Progressive Conservative candidate Steve Zarusky.

Senych was elected Mayor of the Village of Thorhild in 1996 and served until his death in a motor vehicle accident in 2002.

References

External links
Michael Senych death announcement, Alberta Legislative Assembly April 8, 2002.
The Record Alberta Edition, April 2002

Alberta Social Credit Party MLAs
1926 births
2002 deaths
People from the Regional District of East Kootenay
Mayors of places in Alberta
University of Alberta alumni
People from Thorhild County